Gunter Demnig (born 27 October 1947 in Berlin) is a German artist. He is best known for his Stolperstein ("stumbling block") memorials to the victims of Nazi persecution, including Jews, homosexuals, Romani and the disabled. The project places engraved brass stones in front of a former residence for a Holocaust victim who was deported and murdered by Nazi Germany. The memorial effort began in Germany and has since spread, with more than 90,000 stones placed across 26 countries in Europe.

Biography 

Gunter Demnig grew up in Nauen and Berlin and acquired his abitur in 1967. Later that year, he began studying creative education at Berlin University of the Arts with Professor Herbert Kaufmann. From 1969 to 1970, he studied industrial design there. In 1971, he transferred to the Kunsthochschule Kassel, resuming his study of creative education and passed the first state examination in 1974.

That same year, he began studying art with Harry Kramer at the University of Kassel. Following that, he spent two years planning, building and managing historical monuments, from 1977 to 1979. From 1980 to 1985, Demnig was an artistic-scientific colleague on the art faculty at the University of Kassel.

In 1985, he opened his own studio in Cologne and worked on numerous local projects. Since 1994, he has also been involved with the IGNIS-Kulturzentrum (IGNIS Cultural Center).

Demnig's best known work is what he calls Stolpersteine. Stolperstein (in the singular) is the German word for "stumbling block". Demnig's Stolpersteine are small, cobblestone-sized brass memorials for the victims of National Socialism. Set into the pavement of sidewalks in front of the buildings where Nazi victims once lived or worked, they call attention both to the individual victim and the scope of the Nazi war crimes. By 2017, about 61,000 Stolpersteine had been laid in 21 countries in Europe, making the project the world's largest memorial.

Works 

1980: Odor marks, Cassel-Paris
1981: Blood spot, Kassel-London
1988: Travel to West Berlin
1993: Conceives Stolpersteine project
1997: First two Stolpersteine installed at the invitation of Austrian Holocaust Memorial Service founder Andreas Maislinger for the brothers Matthias and Johann Nobis, with legal permit from St. Georgen (near Salzburg)
2000: Project Stolpersteine continues, acquiring permits to install the memorials

Shows
1982: Alte Oper, Frankfurt am Main
1986: Kunsthalle Baden-Baden, Museum of the City of Cologne
1991: Kunstlerhaus Bethanien, Berlin
1995: Academy of Arts, Berlin

Stolpersteine in different countries 

 Austria: Stolpersteine in the district of Braunau am Inn
 Belgium: Stolpersteine in Charleroi
 Czech Republic: Prague: Josefov, Malá Strana, Vršovice and Modřany — Královéhradecký kraj, Ústecký kraj
 Germany: Lake Constance district, Weingarten
 Netherlands
 Ireland: St Catherine's school, Donore Avenue, Dublin https://www.holocausteducationireland.org/news-events/embedding-of-irelands-first-stolpersteine

References

External links

 Stolpersteine website
 Demning résumé at IGNIS

1947 births
Living people
German artists
Stolpersteine
Articles containing video clips
Recipients of the Cross of the Order of Merit of the Federal Republic of Germany
Recipients of the Order of Merit of Baden-Württemberg